Christian Peak -  Lyell 5 or L5 - is the least tall of five distinct subpeaks on Mount Lyell (Canada) and is located on the border of Alberta and British Columbia. It was named in 1972 by Sydney R. Vallance after Christian Hässler, Jr.


Geology and climate
Due to the close proximity of this peak to the central peak, see Mount Lyell for geology and climate.

See also
List of peaks on the British Columbia–Alberta border

References

External links
 Christian Peak photo - the left-most peak only (Walter Peak - AKA Lyell 4 - is on the right): Flickr

Mountains of Banff National Park
Three-thousanders of Alberta
Three-thousanders of British Columbia
Canadian Rockies